Buck Peterson (born in Minnesota) is an American humor writer and cookbook author, best known for The Original Road Kill Cookbook (1985) containing cooking recipes for animals that have been struck and killed by motor vehicles, such as roadkills, which he believes to be a highly underrated food source.

In the early 1980s, he wrote food and wine articles for Playboy. Peterson currently lives outside of Seattle, Washington.

Bibliography

 Buck Peterson's Guide to Indoor Life. Ten Speed Press. 1992. 
 Endangered Species Cookbook. Ten Speed Press. 1993. 

 Wildlife of the New Millennium. Longstreet Press. 1999. 
 The Roadkill USA Coloring & Activity Book. Ten Speed Press. 2001. 

 The Redneck Wedding Planner.. Broadway Books. 2006. 

Quick-Fix Cooking with Roadkill', Andrews McMeel, 2010, ISBN 0-7467-9130-3

References

External links
 Official site

American food writers
Writers from Washington (state)
Living people
Year of birth missing (living people)
Writers from Minnesota
American humorists